Charles Crommelin (1717–1788) was a Governor of Bombay during the British Raj from 1760 to 1767. 

Crommelin was born in Bombay, where his father, Marc Anthony Crommelin was a factor for the British East India Company.  Charles first joined the staff of the East India Company in 1733

Sources
article on Crommelin by Richard Pugh

Governors of Bombay
1717 births
1788 deaths